The Segrave Trophy is awarded to the British national who demonstrates "Outstanding Skill, Courage and Initiative on Land, Water and in the Air".  The trophy is named in honour of Sir Henry Segrave, the first person to hold both the land and water speed records simultaneously.  The award was established by Segrave's wife, Lady Doris, who was "determined to carry on his legacy".  The trophy, designed by sculptor Gilbert Bayes, is awarded by the Royal Automobile Club.  It has been awarded in most years since 1930;  it is not presented if, in the opinion of the committee, no achievement has been sufficient to deserve the award.  Past sponsors of the trophy include Castrol, Ford Motor Company and Aston Martin.

The inaugural recipient of the Segrave Trophy was Australian-born Charles Kingsford Smith who flew solo from Ireland to Newfoundland, across the Atlantic, in just over 31 hours. He also won the 1930 England to Australia air race, covering the distance solo in 13 days. British aviatrix Amy Johnson became the first female recipient of the trophy in 1932 when she was cited for her flight from London to Cape Town in a de Havilland Puss Moth. The Segrave Trophy has been presented posthumously on four occasions, to Geoffrey de Havilland Jr. (1946), Donald Campbell (1966), Bruce McLaren (1969) and Joey Dunlop (2000). The 2018 winner of the Segrave Trophy was the double amputee driver Billy Monger, who at the age of 20, is the youngest recipient of the award.

A subsidiary award, the Segrave Medal, may also be given to those individuals who have "played a fundamental role in helping the Segrave Trophy winner to achieve their goal".  Peter Du Cane received the medal in 1939 for the design and construction of Blue Bird K4.  Bruce McLaren's teammate Denny Hulme and their chief mechanic Cary Taylor won the medal in 1969, their team having won every race of the 1969 Can-Am season.  In 1993, the car designer Eric Broadley was presented with the Segrave Medal for his work with Lola Cars.  Mark Wilkinson received the medal in 2001 as co-pilot to trophy winner Tim Ellison, and Lady Moss, Stirling Moss wife, won it in 2005 for her support of her husband.  Audi's Wolfgang Ullrich, Tom Kristensen and Loïc Duval received the medal in 2013. Carlin founder Trevor Carlin won the Segrave Medal in 2018 for helping Monger return to motor racing. Additionally, the Segrave Certificate of Achievement may be awarded to a person who is not a British national, but would otherwise qualify for recognition.  It has been presented just once, in 2002, to Bjørn Rune Gjelsten who was throttleman for powerboat racer Steve Curtis.

List of recipients

 
At the time of winning, the Australians Kingsford Smith and Hinkler, and New Zealander Batten, were also considered British subjects. New Zealander McLaren's award was after New Zealand's Citizenship Act of 1948 but he was recognised as his McLaren team was British-based.

See also

 List of aviation awards

References

Further reading

External links
Archives of Segrave Trophy at Royal Automobile Club.

Aviation awards
Awards established in 1930